Tarsocera imitator, the deceptive widow, is a butterfly of the family Nymphalidae. It is found in South Africa, in Namaqualand from Steinkopf in the Northern Cape south to the Lambert's Bay area in the Western Cape.

The wingspan is 42–52 mm for males and 50–57 mm for females. Adults are on wing from September to October. There is one generation per year

The larvae probably feed on various Poaceae species.

References

Butterflies described in 1971
Satyrini